Alexander Smith (born 17 January 1915, date of death unknown) was a Scottish footballer who played as a striker.

External links
 LFC History profile

1915 births
Year of death missing
Scottish footballers
Liverpool F.C. players
Buckie Thistle F.C. players
Forres Mechanics F.C. players
Association football forwards
People from Buckie
Scottish football managers
Highland Football League players
British military personnel of World War II
Recipients of the Military Cross
Sportspeople from Moray
English Football League players